Giovanni del Giglio (late fifteenth century – 1557) was a painter from Sardinia   He was born and died in Sassari.

Biography
The first mention of Giovanni del Giglio might be from 1512, when the monk "Johannes de Liliis" arrived in Sassari to restore the hospital of Santa Croce. On August 7, 1522, del Giglio witnessed the will of Giovanni Fontana, father of the jurist Alessio Fontana, who ordered that his property be used for the altarpiece of Sassari Cathedral.

Del Giglio was the attorney of Archbishop Salvatore Alepus, who commissioned del Giglio's Ploaghe altarpiece. From 1532 to 1543, Giglio was part of the Sassari confraternity. Around 1543, he married Andreuccia Olives, the sister of the jurist Girolamo Olives, and the widow of the tailor Forteleoni de Ginesi. From Olive's previous marriage, he gained a stepdaughter, who was born in 1540. Del Giglio had no other children. This marriage allowed him to convince Girolamo Olives' confidant, the bishop of Alghero, Pedro Vaguer, to give him the commission for the altarpieces of Benetutti and Bortigali between 1549 and 1551. These may have been completed by other painters of his school, possibly Pietro Giovanni Calvano, from Siena.

School
Other painters of his school were Antonio Campus, Giovanni Debasteriga, and Leonardo de Serra.   The Ozieri altarpiece is attributed to his school.

Style
Del Giglio's style, which had a large influence on painting in Sardinia until the arrival of Baccio Gorini, shows the influence of Raphael and Michelangelo as well as the early Tuscan style of Rosso Fiorentino and Pontormo. His use of color and techniques placed him among the leading Mannerists in Sardenia.

Notes

References

Luigi Agus, Giovanni del Giglio, Pittura e cultura a Sassari nella prima metà del XVI secolo, Arzachena 2006

People from Sassari
People from Ozieri
1557 deaths
16th-century Italian painters
Italian male painters
Mannerist painters
Year of birth unknown